Montserrat station is an MBTA Commuter Rail Newburyport/Rockport Line station located in Beverly, Massachusetts. Located between Spring Street and Essex Street (MA-22), it serves the eastern part of Beverly and as a park-and-ride station for the North Shore, with easy access from Route 128. Montserrat station has mini-high platforms serving each track, making it accessible.

The station originally opened in 1874. The ticket office in the station building closed on February 22, 1952. The station building was demolished by 1977.

References

External links

 MBTA - Montserrat
 Station from Essex Street from Google Maps Street View

MBTA Commuter Rail stations in Essex County, Massachusetts
Stations along Boston and Maine Railroad lines
Railway stations in the United States opened in 1874